The following lists events that happened during 1966 in Australia.

Incumbents

Monarch – Elizabeth II
Governor-General – Lord Casey
Prime Minister – Sir Robert Menzies (until 26 January), then Harold Holt
Opposition Leader – Arthur Calwell
Chief Justice – Sir Garfield Barwick

State and Territory Leaders
Premier of New South Wales – Robert Askin
Opposition Leader – Jack Renshaw
Premier of Queensland – Frank Nicklin
Opposition Leader – Jack Duggan (until 11 October), then Jack Houston
Premier of South Australia – Frank Walsh
Opposition Leader – Sir Thomas Playford IV (until 13 July), then Steele Hall
Premier of Tasmania – Eric Reece
Opposition Leader – Angus Bethune
Premier of Victoria – (Sir) Henry Bolte
Opposition Leader – Clive Stoneham
Premier of Western Australia – David Brand
Opposition Leader – Albert Hawke (until 31 December), then John Tonkin

Governors and Administrators
Governor of New South Wales – Sir Roden Cutler (from 20 January)
Governor of Queensland – Colonel Sir Henry Abel Smith (until 18 March), then Sir Alan Mansfield (from 21 March)
Governor of South Australia – Lieutenant General Sir Edric Bastyan
Governor of Tasmania – General Sir Charles Gairdner
Governor of Victoria – Major General Sir Rohan Delacombe
Governor of Western Australia – Major General Sir Douglas Kendrew
Administrator of Nauru –  Reginald Leydin (until February), then Leslie King (from 3 May)
Administrator of Norfolk Island – Roger Nott, then Reginald Marsh
Administrator of the Northern Territory – Roger Dean
Administrator of Papua and New Guinea – Sir Donald Cleland (until December)

Events
 26 January –
Robert Menzies, Australia's longest-serving Prime Minister, retires and is succeeded by Harold Holt.
The Beaumont children are abducted during a visit to Glenelg beach in Adelaide and are never seen again.
 14 February – Decimalisation of the Australian currency; the Australian dollar replaces the Australian pound at the rate of ten shillings to the dollar.
The Australian Workers' Union affiliates with the Australian Council of Trade Unions
 the severe drought which has stricken large areas of Australia since 1957, particularly in rural NSW and Queensland, is finally eased by widespread rains
 Jørn Utzon resigns as architect of the Sydney Opera House, following a bitter struggle with the new Public Works Minister Davis Hughes over fees, costs and design changes
 Jack Brabham is named Australian of the Year
 The first National Service conscripts fly out from Richmond RAAF base in Sydney bound for Vietnam
 7 April – New South Wales repeals the Sunday Observance Act, allowing theatres and cinemas to open, sporting events to charge admission and clubs to sell alcohol on Sundays.
 21 June – Federal ALP leader Arthur Calwell is injured in an assassination attempt by 19-year-old Peter Kocan.
 Japan replaces Great Britain as Australia's largest trading partner
 the Council for the Defence of Government Schools (DOGS) is formed in Melbourne
 the Queensland government grants sand mining leases on Fraser Island without holding the required public hearings
 General Motors Holden becomes the first local car manufacturer to install seat belts as standard equipment in all its new vehicles.
 Western Mining Corporation discover rich nickel ore deposits at Kambalda in Western Australia's Goldfields region.
 The Prince of Wales (now Charles III) arrives in Australia to attend Geelong Grammar School's exclusive Timbertop preparatory school.
 the Federal government announces the formation of a military Task Force (including conscripts), increasing Australia's commitment to the Vietnam War to 4,500.
 US Vice-President Hubert Humphrey visits Australia to assure the Australian government that the war is being directed by Hanoi and Peking, and that it represents one of China's numerous offensives in Asia
 Victoria extends hotel trading hours from 6pm to 10pm, ending the infamous "Six O'Clock Swill". Driving with a blood alcohol level over 0.05% becomes a criminal offence.
 On advice from Immigration Minister Hubert Opperman, federal cabinet reverses a decision of September 1964, agreeing that non-Europeans could be selected on an individual basis to enter as immigrants with permanent resident status and naturalisation on an equal basis with European applicants
 The Arbitration Commission introduces a minimum weekly wage for adult male employees under federal awards
 Australian forces engage in their first major battle in Vietnam at the Battle of Long Tan, inflicting heavy losses on NLF troops
 23 August – two hundred Gurindji people walk off Wave Hill Station in the Northern Territory in protest at low wages and poor conditions
 US President Lyndon Johnson arrives for a 3-day visit of Australian east coast cities, sparking rowdy demonstrations by anti-war protesters
 The Liberal Reform Group (which later evolves into the Australian Party) is founded
 Conscientious objector William White is forcibly taken from his home in Sydney and inducted into the army
 Australia negotiates an agreement for an American spy satellite base to be established at Pine Gap in the Northern Territory
 22 September – Ansett-ANA Flight 149 crashes near Winton, Queensland, killing all 24 people on board.
 26 November – The Liberal government of Harold Holt scores a massive victory in the 1966 federal election, and is returned to power with the largest majority in the federal parliament's 65-year history.

Science and technology
 Sydney industrial designer Harry Widmer wins the prestigious F.H. Edwards Laurel Award for his design for the Kriesler Mini 41–47 portable radio. The 41-47's innovative polypropylene plastic casing is the first use of this material anywhere in the world in consumer electronics
 Australia's first satellite communications earth station opens at Carnarvon in WA

Arts and literature

 Jon Molvig's portrait of Charles Blackman wins the Archibald Prize
 Fred Williams' Upwey Landscape is awarded the Wynne Prize
 John Cargher's Singers Of Renown begins on ABC Radio; Cargher is still presenting the show in 2007
 both Sydney's and Melbourne's Tivoli Theatres are closed
 Marion Street Theatre opens in Sydney
 Confectionery manufacturer Hoadley's inaugurates Australia's first national pop band competition, the Hoadley's Battle of the Sounds
 Trap by Peter Mathers is awarded the Miles Franklin Literary Award
 Patrick White: The Solid Mandala
 Geoffrey Blainey: The Tyranny of Distance
 The first edition of the pop magazine Go-Set is published in Melbourne
 The Seekers return to Australia for a triumphant concert tour.
 The Rolling Stones return to Australia for their second tour
 Bob Dylan makes his first tour of Australia, supported by The Band
 The Easybeats leave for London

Film
 The Admiral's Cup wins the AFI Best Film award
 Bruce Beresford is appointed secretary of the British Film Institute's Film Production Board

Television
 Gordon Chater wins the Gold Logie
 Play School first aired on 18 July 1966

Sport
21 May – Anthony Cook wins the men's national marathon title, clocking 2:20:44.6 in Ballarat.
 St Kilda defeats Collingwood in the VFL Grand Final (their only one in 150 years of existence) 
 Galilee wins the Melbourne Cup
 NSW yacht Cadence wins the Sydney to Hobart Yacht Race
 St. George win their 11th consecutive NSWRL premiership, defeating Balmain 23–4 in the Grand Final. This would be St George's final premiership win until 1977. Eastern Suburbs, after not winning a single match, finish in last position, claiming the wooden spoon for the second year in a row.

Births
 1 January – Anna Burke, politician
 4 February – Tony Butterfield, rugby league player
 22 February – Brian Greig, politician
 24 February – David Harris, politician
 9 March – 
 Tony Lockett, AFL football player
 Jonathan O'Dea, politician
 10 March – Katrina Hodgkinson, politician
 1 July – Simon Arkell, pole vaulter
30 July – Allan Langer, rugby league player
 3 August – Simon Shirley, decathlete
 4 September – Gary Neiwand, track cyclist
 18 December – Melina Bath, politician and schoolteacher

Deaths
 21 January
 Sir Richard L. Butler, 31st Premier of South Australia (b. 1885)
 Sir Shane Paltridge, Western Australian politician (b. 1910)
 7 March – Bill Cahill, Australian rules footballer (Essendon) (b. 1911)
 22 September – Ray Maher, New South Wales politician (b. 1911)

See also
 List of Australian films of the 1960s

References

 
Australia
Years of the 20th century in Australia